World Report may refer to:

World Report (CBC), a Canadian news radio program,
World Report (RTÉ), an Irish news radio program,
World Report, a former name of CNN Newsroom
U.S. News & World Report, an American news magazine.